Sir Simon Peter Edmund Cosmo William Towneley  ( Koch de Gooreynd; 14 December 1921 – 11 November 2022) was a British author who served as Lord Lieutenant of Lancashire from 1976 to 1997.

Early life and education
Towneley was born in St George Hanover Square, London, on 14 December 1921, as the elder son of a British father of Belgian stock, Alexander Louis Wynand Koch de Gooreynd, and a British-Belgian mother, Priscilla Reyntiens.

The family name was changed to Worsthorne and he later changed it to Towneley Worsthorne and finally Towneley by deed poll, on 28 May 1955. His younger brother was Sir Peregrine Worsthorne, the journalist. The brothers were brought up as Roman Catholics, but did not attend denominational schools. He was educated at Stowe School and Worcester College, Oxford.

Career
During the Second World War, Worsthorne served in the King's Royal Rifle Corps, receiving a commission as a second lieutenant in December 1942.

In 1954 (under the name Simon Towneley Worsthorne) he published Venetian Opera in the 17th Century, a seminal study of the field, which played a significant role in the remarkable revival of the Venetian opera repertory in the latter 20th century.

Honours
Towneley was appointed High Sheriff of Lancashire for 1971 and Lord Lieutenant of Lancashire from 1976 to 1996.

Towneley was appointed a Knight Commander of the Royal Victorian Order in the 1994 New Year Honours.

Personal life and death
Towneley married his second cousin Mary Fitzherbert, the third of six children of Cuthbert Fitzherbert, from a well-off recusant English Roman Catholic family. She was a keen endurance equestrian, repeating Dick Turpin's ride from London to York and opening up what became known as the Mary Towneley Loop on the Pennine Bridleway.  Lady Towneley died in 2001 from cancer, at the age of 65. The couple had seven children; one son and six daughters including the author K. M. Grant.

Towneley died on 11 November 2022, at the age of 100 at his home in Cliviger.

Footnotes

References
Koch de Gooreynd , William Julien Maurice (1853–1919), first published Sept 2004, 940 words (subscription required)

1921 births
2022 deaths
People educated at Stowe School
Alumni of Worcester College, Oxford
Bertie family
English people of Belgian descent
English people of Dutch descent
Schuyler family
English Roman Catholics
Lord-Lieutenants of Lancashire
High Sheriffs of Lancashire
Knights Commander of the Royal Victorian Order
British Army personnel of World War II
King's Royal Rifle Corps officers
English justices of the peace
English centenarians
Men centenarians